The Tamworth Peel Barracks is a heritage-listed historic site located at 214 Peel Street, Tamworth, Tamworth Regional Council, New South Wales, Australia. The property is owned by Tamworth Regional Council and was added to the New South Wales State Heritage Register on 2 April 1999.

History
The town's first government school was established on this site in 1855.

Built in 1896 at a cost of A£2,000 as the former Tawmorth Town Hall.

On 22 September 1939 the building became a recruiting depot for the Army.

Description 
The structure is a single storey Flemish bond face brick building with white rendered mouldings. The heavily moulded Darling Street facade has tuckpointed brick with five arches forming a symmetrical arcade. The central portico is surmounted by a pediment on Corinthian pilasters. There are masonry balustrades to the verandah and at parapet level, the parapet being broken by a large central pediment. The front door is two leaved, four panelled and half glazed with a fanlight, fluted mullions and sidelights. The windows are surmounted by heavily decorated mouldings. The southern facade is less decorative and features a simple parapet, string courses and a square porch with keystone arches. The northern wing is the fully rendered former Town Hall with pediment, pilasters and the curtilage is the fenced property boundary.

See also 

Military history of Australia

References

Attribution 

New South Wales State Heritage Register
Tamworth, New South Wales
Australian Army bases
Articles incorporating text from the New South Wales State Heritage Register
Buildings and structures completed in 1896
1896 establishments in Australia
Town halls in New South Wales